Kęstutis Bartkėnas is a paralympic athlete from Lithuania competing mainly in category T11 distance running events.

Kestutis has competed and won medals at three Paralympics.  His first was in 1996 in Atlanta where he competed in the 1500m and won z bronze in the 10000m and a silver in the 5000m.  He followed this up in 2000 with a bronze in the 5000m as well as competing in the 1500m.  For the 2004 Summer Paralympics Kestutis moved up in distance winning a bronze medal in the 10000m but ultimately failed to finish in the marathon.

References

Paralympic athletes of Lithuania
Athletes (track and field) at the 1996 Summer Paralympics
Athletes (track and field) at the 2000 Summer Paralympics
Athletes (track and field) at the 2004 Summer Paralympics
Paralympic silver medalists for Lithuania
Paralympic bronze medalists for Lithuania
Living people
Medalists at the 1996 Summer Paralympics
Medalists at the 2000 Summer Paralympics
Medalists at the 2004 Summer Paralympics
Year of birth missing (living people)
Paralympic medalists in athletics (track and field)
Lithuanian male long-distance runners
Visually impaired long-distance runners
Paralympic long-distance runners